This Man Dawson is a syndicated drama television series that was broadcast during 1959-60, starring Keith Andes as a former United States Marine Corps colonel hired to clean up police corruption in an undisclosed American city. The series was partly inspired by Andes’ Universal Studios film Damn Citizen (1958), in which he played crusading Louisiana State Police Superintendent Francis C. Grevemberg. It was a production of Ziv Television.

The program narrator is the late William Conrad, formerly the voice on the radio version of Gunsmoke and later the star of CBS' Cannon detective series. The black and white half-hour series was filmed by Ziv, later part of MGM Television.

Notable guest stars

John Archer in the episode "The Assassin"
Walter Burke as "Jumpy" Higgins in "Plague"
Paul Fix as Al Daniels and Joi Lansing as Carol Dawn in "Accessory to Murder"
Clegg Hoyt in "Fight Game"
Vivi Janiss and Karl Swenson in "Intimidation"
Tyler MacDuff as Ira Burns in "Get Dawson"
Judson Pratt in "The Hard Way"
 Michael Raffetto appeared in "Three X" and "The Deadly Young Man"

References

1959 American television series debuts
1960 American television series endings
1950s American drama television series
1960s American drama television series
First-run syndicated television programs in the United States
Black-and-white American television shows
Television series by MGM Television